, also known as KNB, is a Japanese broadcast network affiliated with Nippon News Network (NNN) and Nippon Television Network System (NNS). Their headquarters are located in Toyama Prefecture.

Network 
 TV: Nippon News Network (NNN)
 RADIO: Japan Radio Network (JRN), National Radio Network (NRN)

Stations

Analog TV
Toyama (Main Station) JOLR-TV 1ch
Nanto-Toga 6ch
Unazuki 36ch
Hosoiri-Inotani 39ch
Himi-Ronden 41ch

Digital TV(ID:1) 
Toyama (Main Station) JOLR-DTV 28ch

Radio
Toyama(Main Station) JOLR 738 kHz; 80.1 MHz, 90.2 MHz

Programs

Radio

TV

Rival Stations 
Toyama Television(BBT)
TulipTelevision(TUT)
Hokuriku Asahi Broadcasting(HAB, by introducing CATV)

External links
 KNB WEB

Television stations in Japan
Radio in Japan
Nippon News Network
Television channels and stations established in 1959
Mass media in Toyama (city)